Andrew Snowdon (born 26 September 1965) is an English cricketer. He is a left-handed batsman and right-arm medium-pace bowler who played for Cornwall. He was born in Plymouth.

Having represented the team in the Minor Counties Championship between 1983 and 1986, Snowdon made a single List A appearance for the side, in his final year at the club, against Derbyshire. From the middle order, he scored 9 runs. He bowled 12 overs during the match, taking figures of 0-97.

His brother, Michael Snowdon, made a single List A appearance for Cornwall during the 1975 season.

External links
Andrew Snowdon at Cricket Archive 
Cricinfo profile

1965 births
Living people
English cricketers
Cornwall cricketers